Brain is a supervillain appearing in American comic books published by DC Comics. Commonly as a frequent enemy of the Doom Patrol and the Teen Titans, he is a French genius and criminal mastermind.

The Brain appears as the main antagonist in the third season of the HBO Max series Doom Patrol, voiced by Riley Shanahan.

Publication history
The Brain first appeared in Doom Patrol #86 (March 1964) and was created by Arnold Drake and Bruno Premiani. Drake later commented: "I used that same concept in a Jerry Lewis comic book, and in a Bob Hope comic I had a totem pole that talked to him. Often times, I wrote the same storylines for the comedy stuff that I wrote for the serious stuff. I just turned it on its head".

Fictional character biography
As a scientist, the Brain performs experiments on animals to raise their intelligence. One of these is on a gorilla, who he names Monsieur Mallah and educates for almost a decade before making him his personal assistant. His colleague Niles Caulder grows jealous of his work and arranges for the Brain to get caught in an explosion, which destroys his body. Only the brain survives, which Caulder plans on putting into a robotic body. Mallah rescues the Brain, transferring him to a computer network that keeps him functioning.

The Brain and Mallah form the Brotherhood of Evil in hopes of conquering the world and getting revenge on Caulder where it gains members like Madame Rouge, General Immortus, and Garguax. Caulder, now known as the "Chief", through a series of other accidents that he manipulated, forms the Doom Patrol (Caulder's involvement in the events which transformed the Doom Patrol, and the Brain, was a retcon decades after the creation of the Doom Patrol and the Brain; originally the incidents were genuine accidents). The Brain, Mallah, and their Brotherhood's criminal activities also pit them against the Teen Titans. The Brotherhood go against the newly formed Justice League, with the Brain using a genetic splicer to take the Flash's legs, Green Lantern's ring, Black Canary's vocal chords, and the Martian Manhunter's eyes. The Brain is defeated by the League and the Doom Patrol, the League using cybernetic implants created by Niles Caulder to compensate for their lost powers. Aquaman is thrown to the Brain, overpowers his control of the ring, and separates the Brain from his makeshift body.

During Grant Morrison's Doom Patrol run, Mallah places the Brain in Robotman's new body (Robotman's brain had been removed from it due to its malfunctioning). In his new body, the Brain confesses to Mallah he is in love with him. When Mallah reveals he feels the same way, the two kiss. However, Robotman's body, having developed sentience and vowed never to be enslaved by a brain again, triggers a self-destruct mechanism and explodes as they kiss.

The two later resurface (the Brain back to floating in a jar), with no explanation of how they survived the explosion. The Brotherhood begins raiding genetic research facilities to unlock the secrets of cloning and create a new body for the Brain, so he and Monsieur Mallah can resume their romance. After a short while the Brain's new clone body begins to break down, so he has Mallah rip off his head and put his brain back into another jar.

In the Salvation Run storyline, Brain and Monsieur Mallah appear amongst the villains that were sent to the planet Cygnus 4019. An altercation between Monsieur Mallah and Gorilla Grodd ends with Grodd beating Monsieur Mallah to death with Brain's chassis, also killing Brain in the process.

In September 2011, The New 52 rebooted DC's continuity. In this continuity, Brain was originally a New England scientist named Ernst who experimented on a gorilla named Mallah to increase his intellect. He treated Mallah like a friend and an assistant. When an explosion occurred in his lab, Ernst was badly burned and Mallah saved his life by preserving his brain. After becoming distrustful of humans, Brain took Mallah into attacking humans that they blamed for their plight. Then they raided LexCorp where they received a cyber optic nerve so that Brain can see. During a standoff with the Special Crimes Unit, Maggie Sawyer tried to talk them down and agreed to help them if they surrendered.

In an alternate future of this new timeline, Brain and Monsieur Mallah assist Gorilla Grodd in taking over the remains of Central City at the time when The Black had taken over most of the world. They capture Animal Man and the heroes that are with him. Animal Man's group is saved by Frankenstein and his Patchwork Army.

He reappears in DC Rebirth. The Brotherhood of Evil worked together on a narcotic element which is then distributed to the addict population of New York City. The designer drug, Bliss; in actuality was designed to put people in a fugue state so Brain could use their dormant mental capacity as a type of cloud space to expand his own intellect into godlike territories.

In record time, Brain and Monsieur Mallah spearheaded their opiate both from a purer sample that they created. And through faulty counterfeits fabricated by the rival underlife, both having purposely leaked the original formula on the black market, then enlisted the mercenary Cheshire to steal back their original concoction while furthering the goal of expanding Brain's intelligence.

As his acumen began to reach hyper-genius levels of intellectual capacity. The Brain began to physically transcend his mortal coil at varying percentages over time, 10-15% enabling him to solve unsolvable mathematic formulas while masking his and Monsieur Mallah's operation, 23% giving him power over climate change and weather patterns, 47% enabling natural disaster & cosmological force phenomena manipulation and so on and so forth. As his mental abilities increased more and more with time he situated ecological catastrophes as bait to lure his enemies in the Justice League towards various traps while he worked towards achieving transcendent consciousness.

His ascent to godhood also came with the side effect of nullifying his empathy; becoming personally distant from the humanistic coil such as relations and his dearest confidante. To that end, Mallah betrayed Brain to the Titans before he could reshape reality to his own ends, ending the threat he posed for good.

Brain retired from the villain life and went to go see Faye Gunn about the ad for a teacher. She didn't trust him due to his villainous association with the Brotherhood of Evil. She did encourage Brain to know the Generation Outlaws better.

During the "Year of the Villain", Joker imprisoned Brain and Monsieur Mallah in an old fair ground at the time when The Batman Who Laughs was infecting people. Joker tortured them and left their care in Lex Luthor's hands in exchange for the knowledge to defeat The Batman Who Laughs.

Powers and abilities
One of the most formidable villains ever encountered by the Doom Patrol, or even in DC Comics, The Brain is more of a cerebral opponent but all the more dangerous for it. A former polymath, The Brain has a genius-level IQ which he puts to use as a criminal mastermind and is more than capable of plotting out perfect crimes. The Brain is completely single-minded and motivated almost entirely towards the domination of others, the committing of even more perfect crimes, and ultimate revenge against Niles Caulder. Adept in psychology, he is also a master of coercion, deceit, and manipulation, being able to persuade almost anybody to do his dirty work for him, even to the point where his agents are under the illusion that they are not actually committing evil or immoral acts.

It is, however, hinted that it is a result of mind control through telepathy by The Brain. It was through these cerebral abilities that The Brain was able to unite various villains under his leadership, forming the Brotherhood of Evil. Although others often act as brawns to his brain, most notably his assistant–partner Monsieur Mallah, The Brain has occasionally used agile robotic bodies to give him mobility. The different contraptions which have been seen to hold his brain were designed by The Brain himself (also a master in biology and robotics) and have proved time and time again to be durable and even nigh-indestructible.

On the rare occasion when The Brain has been vulnerable without robotic protection or assistance from other villains, he has protected himself by attacking opponents through telekinesis. Except for the times when he possesses robot bodies, the Brain is portrayed as an ordinary human brain, albeit housed within what could be described as a life-sized chess piece which contains the equipment required to keep him alive; it is this portrayal that was adapted in the animated versions of the Brain as mentioned in this article. In the original Doom Patrol series, he was regularly portrayed as a disembodied brain, bobbing inside a sealed dome filled with a nutrient bath, hooked up with numerous machines, including a loudspeaker to convey his voice.

During a confrontation with the newly-formed Justice League and the Doom Patrol, the Brain used genetics equipment provided by the mysterious Locus organization to 'steal' the Martian Manhunter's eyes, Black Canary's vocal cords, the Flash's legs, and Green Lantern's right arm, granting him access to the Manhunter's vision abilities, Canary's sonic scream, the Flash's speed, and Green Lantern's power ring. However, during this time he was only ever shown using the ring and was caught off-guard by its vulnerability to yellow, with Aquaman eventually managing to overpower the Brain's will and use the ring to sever him from his makeshift body.

In Rebirth, The Brain found a way to increase his intelligence by tapping some several hundred thousand people's vacant thought spaces to achieve mental divinity. Not only showcasing increased cognizant genius but obtaining various superpowers accessed via the power of his mind alone as a result. Having solved Ordlich's heuristic paradox and deciphered the Voynich manuscript while masking his whereabouts from outside detection, changing and manipulating weather patterns via remote climate alteration, engineering natural disasters, manipulating cosmic & quantum force, casting himself into technology alla Cyborg-Superman, twist space/time and manipulating reality by sheer force of will.

Other characters named Brain
DC Comics previously had other villains named the Brain:

The first villain was an ordinary criminal who earned his nickname for his cleverness and was not literally just a brain. He alongside Captain Bigg, Hopper, False-Face and Rattler were one of five small-time villains hired by Black Star to commit a bank robbery. They were all foiled by the Seven Soldiers of Victory.

The second villain to use the name Brain was a crime boss who fought Flash.

The third villain to use the name Brain is a crime boss who fought Wonder Woman and manipulated her into questioning her own existence.

The fourth villain to use the name Brain is a criminal mastermind who fought Superman.

Brain was also the alias used by three identical brothers who commit crimes while the city has been distracted by three giant boxes they have placed in each other after a fog has descended on the city, which the authorities try to open. The Flash jails the first two as they attempt robberies with clever tricks, like a tightrope which the first one cuts and spring-heeled shoes, and jails the last one when he attempts a bank robbery by draining his live wire suit with which he intended to break his brothers out with silver. It is then revealed the last box led into the bank vault.

Other versions

Earth-S
On Earth-S, the Brain is Warden Loomis, a serial killer who is an enemy of Mr. Scarlet and Pinky the Whiz Kid.

In other media

Television
 The Brain appears in The Superman/Aquaman Hour of Adventure episode "The Brain, the Brave and the Bold".
 The Brain appears in the fifth season of Teen Titans, voiced by Glenn Shadix. This version is emotionless, relies on others to act on his behalf, and possesses limited telepathy and telekinesis. He leads the Brotherhood of Evil in an attempt to eliminate young heroes around the world, only to be thwarted and flash-frozen by the Teen Titans.
 The Brain appears in Batman: The Brave and the Bold, voiced by Dee Bradley Baker. This version's robotic shell possesses a variety of weapons mounted on extendable robotic arms.
 The Brain appears in Young Justice, voiced by Nolan North in his first appearance and by Corey Burton in all subsequent appearances. This version is a leading member of the Light in the first two seasons until he is captured by the Team.
 The Brain appears in Teen Titans Go! (2013), voiced by Scott Menville. This version goes through several robot bodies, such as Project B.R.I.A.N. (Brain's Robotic Indestructible Armor Nexus), a four-armed spider-like body, and a giant stone mech.
 The Brain appears in the Justice League Action episode "The Brain Buster", voiced by Jim Ward.
 The Brain appears in Doom Patrol, voiced by Riley Shanahan. This version has had several encounters with the Doom Patrol, with one seeing him using his Ultimax form before Steve Dayton claimed his robotic body, though the Brain escaped. In the present, the Brain tasks Madame Rouge with attacking the Doom Patrol and stealing Robotman's body for him as her initiation into the Brotherhood of Evil. After taking control of the body however, Monsieur Mallah leaves him before Robotman gains control of Brain's brain jar and discarded giant robot and defeats him. After salvaging Robotman's body, Rita Farr kills Brain.

Video games
 The Brain appears in DC Universe Online, voiced by Leif Anders.
 The Brain appears as the final boss of the DS version of Batman: The Brave and the Bold – The Videogame.
 The Brain makes a cameo appearance in Injustice: Gods Among Us as part of the Insurgency headquarters stage.
 The Brain appears as a non-playable character in Lego DC Super-Villains, voiced by Jason Spisak.

Miscellaneous
 The Brain appears in Teen Titans Go! (2004).
 The Brain appears in Justice League Adventures.
 The Brain appears in Smallville Season 11 #9 as Monsieur Mallah's lover.
 The Young Justice incarnation of the Brain appears in issues #18 and #19 of the Young Justice tie-in comic book series. This version was originally among a group of scientists, led by an old woman who would become the Ultra-Humanite, who settled in Bwunda to conduct experiments on the native gorillas before having his brain transplanted into a robotic container. After building Gorilla City, the scientists enslaved the gorillas, enhanced their intellect with Kobra venom, placed inhibitor collars on them, and took their offspring hostage. Two years later, the scientists are pursued by the Team, who form an alliance with the gorillas. Despite destroying Gorilla City and freeing the offspring, the Brain and Ultra-Humanite escape.

References

External links
 Brain at DC Database
 The Brain at Comic Vine

Characters created by Arnold Drake
Comics characters introduced in 1964
Cyborg supervillains
DC Comics LGBT supervillains
DC Comics male supervillains
DC Comics characters who are shapeshifters
DC Comics characters who have mental powers
DC Comics cyborgs
DC Comics scientists
DC Comics telekinetics
DC Comics telepaths
Doom Patrol
Fictional characters who can manipulate reality
Fictional characters who can manipulate time
Fictional characters with elemental transmutation abilities
Fictional characters with weather abilities
Fictional French people
Fictional gay males
Fictional mad scientists
Fictional technopaths